The Walper Hotel (formerly Walper House and also known as the Walper Terrace Hotel) is a hotel in Kitchener, Ontario, Canada. The current hotel building was constructed in 1893 for $75,000 after a previous establishment, known as John Roat's Commercial Hotel, burned down in 1892. On 14 March 1983, it received heritage designation by the City of Kitchener under Part IV (Municipal Heritage Designation) of the Ontario Heritage Act.

In September 2013, the hotel was bought by the Zehr Group, the Perimeter Development Corporation, David Struke and CK Atlantis Ltd. for $4.6 million. The Hotel was renovated in 2016 and reopened in May and June for weddings and in July for guests. The renovation cost $3.5 million.

See also
 List of historic places in Regional Municipality of Waterloo
 List of oldest buildings and structures in the Regional Municipality of Waterloo

References

External links
 Hotel website
 

Hotels in Ontario
Buildings and structures in Kitchener, Ontario